Franklin Augustus Alberger (January 14, 1825 – August 24, 1877) was an American businessman and politician from New York.

Life
He was the son of Job Alberger, a butcher who owned a shop and slaughterhouses. In 1837, the family removed to Buffalo. Franklin learned the butcher's trade from his father, and opened a pork packing business with his brothers. He married Katharine Rice, and they had four children.

He entered politics as a Whig and joined the Republican Party on its foundation. In 1854, he was elected alderman from the Eleventh Ward, and in 1859 from the Ninth Ward. The Union city convention was held on October 22, 1859, and after many ballots Alberger was nominated for Mayor. He was Mayor of Buffalo, New York from January 2, 1860, to January 6, 1862.

He was a Canal Commissioner from 1862 to 1867, elected in 1861 and 1864 on the Union ticket.

He was a Republican member of the New York State Assembly (Erie Co., 3rd D.) in 1871, 1872, 1873 and 1874.

He died suddenly, apparently of cholera, and was buried at the Forest Lawn Cemetery, Buffalo.

Sources
The New York Civil List compiled by Franklin Benjamin Hough, Stephen C. Hutchins and Edgar Albert Werner (1867; pages 400, 406 and 505)
 Political Graveyard [without middle initial]
 The Mayors of Buffalo, at The Buffalonian

1825 births
1897 deaths
Businesspeople from Buffalo, New York
Erie Canal Commissioners
Members of the New York State Assembly
Mayors of Buffalo, New York
Politicians from Baltimore
Burials at Forest Lawn Cemetery (Buffalo)
New York (state) Republicans
New York (state) Whigs
19th-century American politicians
Businesspeople from Baltimore
19th-century American businesspeople
 deaths from cholera
 infectious disease deaths in New York (state)